Don R. Swanson (October 10, 1924 – November 18, 2012) was an American information scientist, most known for his work in literature-based discovery in the biomedical domain. His particular method has been used as a model for further work, and is often referred to as Swanson linking. He was an investigator in the Arrowsmith System project, which seeks to determine meaningful links between Medline articles to identify previously undiscovered public knowledge. He had been professor emeritus of the University of Chicago since 1996, and remained active in a post-retirement appointment until his health began to decline in 2009.

Swanson received his B.S. in Physics at Caltech, Pasadena, California in 1945, followed by an M.A at Rice Institute, Houston, Texas, two years later, and then a PhD in Theoretical Physics from the University of California at Berkeley in 1952. He worked as a physicist at various laboratories until 1963, when he was made a professor and served as dean of the Graduate School of Library Science at the University of Chicago until 1972 and again from 1977 to 1979 and 1987 to 1989.

In 2000, he was awarded the ASIST Award of Merit, the highest honor of the society, for his "lifetime achievements in research and scholarship."

References
 Works
 1986a: "Undiscovered public knowledge." Library Quarterly 56(2): 103–118.  
 1986b: "Fish oil, Raynaud's syndrome, and undiscovered public knowledge." Perspectives in Biology and Medicine 30(1): 7–18.
 1987: "Two medical literatures that are logically but not bibliographically connected." Journal of the American Society of Information Science 38(4): 228–233.
 1988: "Migraine and magnesium: Eleven neglected connections." Perspectives in Biology and Medicine 31(4): 526–557.
 1989a: "Online search for logically-related noninteractive medical literature: A systematic trial-and-error strategy." Journal of the American Society of Information Science 40: 356–358. 
 1989b: "A second example of mutually-isolated medical literatures related by implicit, unnoticed connections." Journal of the American Society of Information Science 40: 432–435. 
 1990a: "Somatomedin C and arginine: Implicit connections between mutually-isolated literatures," Perspectives in Biology and Medicine 33 (1990): 157–186.
 1990b: "Medical literature as a potential source of new knowledge." bulletin of the Medical Library Association 78(1) 29–37.
 1990c: "Integrative mechanisms in the growth of knowledge: A legacy of Manfred Kochen." Information Processing & Management 26(1): 9–16. 
 1990d: "The absence of co-citation as a clue to undiscovered causal connections." In: C. L. Brogman, ed. Scholarly Communication and Bibliometrics. 129–137. Sage Publ., Newbury Park, CA. 
 1991: "Complementary structures in disjoint science literatures." In: A. Bookstein, et al., eds., SIGIR91 Proceedings of the Fourteenth Annual International ACM/SIGIR Conference on Research and Development in Information Retrieval. Chicago, Oct. 13–16, 1991. New York: ACM. pp. 280–9. ACM
 1993: "Intervening in the life cycles of scientific knowledge," Library Trends 41(4): 606–631. 
 1996: "Undiscovered public knowledge: A ten-year update." In: Data Mining: Integration & Application (KDD-96 Proceedings, AAAI) 295–298. (with  Neil R. Smalheiser)  http://www.aaai.org/Papers/KDD/1996/KDD96-051.pdf
 1997: "An interactive system for finding complementary literatures: a stimulus to scientific discovery," Artificial Intelligence, (91)2: 183–203. (with  Neil R. Smalheiser) ACM
 1999: "Implicit text linkages between Medline records: Using Arrowsmith as an aid to scientific discovery." Library Trends 48(l): 48–59. (with  Neil R. Smalheiser)
 2001: "Information discovery from complementary literatures: categorizing viruses as potential weapons." Journal of the American Society for Information Science and Technology 52(10): 797–812. (with Neil R. Smalheiser and A. Bookstein) ACM
 2006: "Ranking indirect connections in literature-based discovery: The role of medical subject headings." Journal of the American Society for Information Science and Technology 57(11):1427–39. (with Neil R. Smalheiser and Vetle I. Torvik) ACM  https://web.archive.org/web/20100326164704/http://kiwi.uchicago.edu/JA2434.pdf

 Notes

External links
 Bio
 ASIST Award of Merit Acceptance Speech 
 ARROWSMITH: a semi-automated literature linking tool
 portrait
 Obituary from University of Chicago

American bioinformaticians
Information scientists
California Institute of Technology alumni
Rice University alumni
University of California, Berkeley alumni
2012 deaths
University of Chicago faculty
1924 births